Good Riddance Day is an unofficial holiday in New York City's Times Square celebrating the departure of unwanted memories, observed on December 28 since 2007. It was created by the Times Square Alliance.

References

2007 establishments in New York City
Culture of New York City
Unofficial observances
Times Square